{{DISPLAYTITLE:C20H30O5}}
The molecular formula C20H30O5 (molar mass: 350.449 g/mol, exact mass: 350.2093 u) may refer to:

 Andrographolide
 Prostaglandin E3 (PGE3)

Molecular formulas